Hindostan was launched at Liverpool in 1817. initially, she traded with India under a licence from the British East India Company (EIC). She also traded with the United States, Singapore, Africa, and Central America. She was wrecked on 24 December 1838 near Omoa, Honduras.

Career
Hindostan first appeared in Lloyd's Register (LR) in 1818.

In 1813 the EIC had lost its monopoly on the trade between India and Britain. British ships were then free to sail to India or the Indian Ocean under a licence from the EIC.

Hindostan, R.Stewart, master, sailed for Bombay on 31 January 1817. She arrived back at Liverpool from Bengal on 13 January 1819. She had sailed from the Cape on 8 December 1818.

On 25 January 1820, Hindostan, Kirkwood, master, sailed for Bombay.

Hindostan, C.Jackson, master, was among the British ships in the Bonny River in April 1837 when Commander Robert Craigie of the sloop  overthrew the usurper Annah Pepple, to the Kingdom of Bonny, and reinstated Dappa Pepple. The British signed a new treaty on 9 April 1837.

Fate
Hindostan, Pearce, master, was on her way from Omoa, Honduras to Belize when she wrecked on 24 December 1838 near Omoa. Her materials, cargo, and crew were saved.

Hindostan was no longer listed in the volume of Lloyd's Register for 1839.

Citations and references
Citations

References
 

1817 ships
Age of Sail merchant ships
Merchant ships of the United Kingdom
Maritime incidents in December 1838